Lee Yoo-young (Korean: 이유영; born January 23, 1995), better known mononymously as Yooyoung, later, the stage name was changed to Lee Hwa-kyum (Korean:이화겸), is a South Korean singer and actress. She is best known as a former member of South Korean girl group Hello Venus.

Career 
Lee made her debut as member of South Korean girl group Hello Venus on May 9, 2012. Her first actively promoted release was Hello Venus's debuted their album Venus on M! Countdown on May 10, 2012. As of their debut, Hello Venus has released five EPs.

In June 2021, Lee signed a contract with Prain TPC.

Discography

Filmography

Film

Television series

Web series

Television shows

References

External links 
 
 

1995 births
Living people
Hello Venus members
Fantagio artists
South Korean female idols
South Korean women pop singers
South Korean actresses
South Korean television actresses
21st-century South Korean singers
21st-century South Korean women singers
People from Suwon
Chung-Ang University alumni